, previously Project S22 and Submarine No. 44, was a submarine in commission in the Imperial Japanese Navy from 1924 to 1938. Although not a successful design, she was the lead vessel and prototype of the Japanese s which served in World War II. The Japanese also used her for early experiments in the development of submarine aircraft carriers.

Background
Following World War I, the Imperial Japanese Navy General Staff began to re-consider submarine warfare as an element of fleet strategy. Before the war, the Imperial Japanese Navy regarded submarines as useful only for short-range coastal point defense. However, based on the success of the Imperial German Navy in deploying long-range cruiser submarines for commerce raiding during World War I, Japanese strategists came to realieze the potential for using submarines for long-range reconnaissance, as well as in a war of attrition against an enemy fleet approaching Japan. Procurement of a large, long-range Japanese submarine was authorized in fiscal year 1918 under the Eight-six fleet program, under the designation Project S22.

Design
Japanese ties to the United Kingdom via the Anglo-Japanese Alliance were still strong in the immediate aftermath of World War I, and Project S22 was based on the latest Royal Navy design, the British K-class submarine. With a displacement of 1390 tons, Project S22 was the largest submarine built in Japan up to that time. To accommodate these engines, a double hull design was used, with hulls joined side-by-side, forming a sideways figure "8".

Despite various technical achievements the Japanese made in I-51′s design, they did not regard her as a successful design, largely because of problems with her Sulzer diesel engines. She saw only limited fleet service.

Construction and commissioning
Project S22 was laid down at the Kure Naval Arsenal in Kure, Japan, on 6 April 1921, launched on 29 November 1921, and completed on 20 June 1924, by which time she had received the name .

Operational history

Upon completion, Submarine No. 44 was commissioned and attached to the Kure Naval District. From 17 July 1924 to 1 May 1925, she was assigned to Submarine Squadron 2 in the 2nd Fleet, a component of the Combined Fleet, and during her stint with the squadron she was renamed I-51 on 1 November 1924. She returned to duty in the Kure Naval District from 1 May until 1 December 1925, when she was assigned along with the submarine  to Submarine Division 17, which was reactivated that day as a component of Submarine Squadron 2, which in turn remained part of the 2nd Fleet in the Combined Fleet. On 10 December 1928, Submarine Division 17 was reassigned to the Kure Naval District.

I-51 remained a part of Submarine Division 17 until the division's deactivation on 11 November 1935. The division was assigned to the Kure Naval District throughout the years from December 1928 to November 1935, also serving in the Kure Defense Division from 30 November 1929 to 1 December 1930 and again from 1 October 1932 to 1 January 1933. Unsuccessful in fleet service due to problems with her diesel engines, I-51 never returned to the fleet after Submarine Division 17′s reassignment to the Kure Naval District in 1928. Instead, she was retained as part of Submarine Division 17 at the Kure Naval Arsenal for crew training and as a test bed for various submarine technologies.

In May 1929, I-51 began experimental work in submarine-based operation of the Yokosho 2-Go, the first prototype of the Yokosuka E6Y floatplane. She completed this testing program by September 1931. In 1931 she was fitted with an aircraft hangar which could house one floatplane which could be raised and lowered into the water by a crane, and she began testing the operation of the second E6Y prototype, the Yokosho 2-Go Kai. In 1933, an aircraft catapult was installed on her deck, making her the forerunner of the Japanese submarine aircraft carriers of World War II.

In addition to her experimental work, I-51 began duty in 1930 as a training submarine at Kure. In 1932, two of her diesel engines and their associated shafts were removed, as was her main deck gun.

After the deactivation of Submarine Division 17 on 15 November 1935, I-51 was attached directly to the Kure Naval District, and she continued her training duties until she was decommissioned and placed in the Fourth Reserve on 15 December 1938. While in the Fourth Reserve, she was reassigned to the Maizuru Naval District on 15 November 1939.

I-51 was removed from the navy list on 1 April 1940, and she was hulked that day with the name Haikan No. 3 or Haisen No. 3. She was sold and scrapped in 1941.

References

Footnotes

Bibliography

External links

1921 ships
Ships built by Kure Naval Arsenal
Kaidai-class submarines